Lindsey Scott Jr. (born June 11, 1998) is an American football quarterback for Incarnate Word.

Scott Jr. began his college football career with LSU before transferring to East Mississippi Community College where he threw for over 3,400 yards and 29 touchdowns. After one year he transferred for a second time to Missouri where he sat a year due to an injury. He would transfer once again for a third time to FCS school Nicholls after sitting a season with Missouri. Scott transferred as a graduate transfer for a fourth and final time to Incarnate Word and FCS records for touchdown passes and touchdowns responsible for.

Early life and high school
Scott Jr. grew up in Zachary, Louisiana and attended Zachary High School. As a senior, he was named the Louisiana Gatorade Player of the Year completed 163 of 255 pass attempts for 3,039 yards and 33 touchdowns with five interceptions and also rushed for 1,963 yards and 28 touchdowns. Scott was rated a three-star recruit and committed to play college football at LSU over offers from Syracuse, Tulane, Rutgers, and Maryland.

College career

LSU 
Scott began his college career at LSU and redshirted his true freshman season. He left the team after his redshirt season after the firing of head coach Les Miles.

East Mississippi Community College 
Scott transferred to East Mississippi Community College. in 2017, he passed for 3,481 yards and 29 touchdowns with 11 interceptions and also rushed for 729 yards and six touchdowns as the Lions won the NJCAA national championship. Following the end of the season he committed to transfer to the University of Missouri.

Missouri 
Scott spent one season with the Missouri Tigers and served as a scout team quarterback before sustaining an injury that lead to a medical redshirt. He entered the NCAA transfer portal at the beginning of the 2019 season.

Nicholls 
Scott transferred to Nicholls and sat out the 2019 season due to NCAA transfer rules. The following season, which was shortened and played in the spring of 2021 due to COVID-19, he passed for 1,684 yards and 18 touchdowns and also led the Colonels in rushing with 557 yards and six touchdowns. As a redshirt senior, Scott passed for 2,083 yards and 16 touchdowns and rushed for 990 yards and nine touchdowns. After the season, he decided to utilize the extra year of eligibility granted to college athletes who played in the 2020 season due to the pandemic and re-entered the transfer portal.

Incarnate Word 
Scott transferred to the University of the Incarnate Word for a seventh college season. He was named the starter during spring practices after transferring. Scott completed 18-of-25 passes for 406 yards with four touchdowns and an interception in a 55-41 upset win over FBS Nevada. Scott was named the Southland Conference Player of the Year at the end of the regular season. He was also named a finalist for the Walter Payton Award.

In his final college season at UIW, Scott set a new FCS record for touchdown passes in a season with 60. He broke the previous record of 57, set by Jeremiah Briscoe of Sam Houston in 2016, with four TD passes in a 66–63 shootout win over Sacramento State in the FCS quarterfinals. Scott's college career ended the following week with UIW's 35–32 semifinal loss to North Dakota State. He finished the season with 321 completions on 453 pass attempts for 4,657 yards and 60 touchdowns and also rushed 132 times for 712 yards and 11 touchdowns. Scott won the Walter Payton Award at the end of the season.

College statistics

Professional career
Scott was selected by the Pittsburgh Maulers second overall in the 2023 USFL Draft.

Personal life
Scott's father, Lindsey Scott Sr., played running back at Southern University and briefly in the Canadian Football League. His younger brother, Logan, plays defensive back at Nicholls State.

References

External links
LSU Tigers bio
East Mississippi Lions bio
Missouri Tigers bio
Nicholls Colonels bio
Incarnate Word Cardinals bio

1998 births
Living people
Players of American football from Louisiana
American football quarterbacks
LSU Tigers football players
Missouri Tigers football players
Nicholls Colonels football players
Incarnate Word Cardinals football players
East Mississippi Lions football players
People from Zachary, Louisiana
Sportspeople from East Baton Rouge Parish, Louisiana